The Mt. Hebron M.E. Church South and Cemetery is a historic Methodist church at 1079 Mt. Hebron Road in Colville, Arkansas.  The church is a modest Plain Traditional wood-frame church, built in 1904 for a congregation established in 1872.  The adjacent cemetery also recorded its first burial that year.  The church played a significant role in the growth and development of the community in the 19th century.

The property was listed on the National Register of Historic Places in 2003.

See also
 National Register of Historic Places listings in Benton County, Arkansas

References

External links
 

Methodist churches in Arkansas
Churches on the National Register of Historic Places in Arkansas
Churches in Benton County, Arkansas
National Register of Historic Places in Benton County, Arkansas
1872 establishments in Arkansas
Cemeteries on the National Register of Historic Places in Arkansas
Churches completed in 1872
Cemeteries established in the 1870s